John 1:19 is the nineteenth verse in the first chapter of the Gospel of John in the New Testament of the Christian Bible.

Content
In the original Greek according to Westcott-Hort this verse is:
Καὶ αὕτη ἐστὶν ἡ μαρτυρία τοῦ Ἰωάννου, ὅτε ἀπέστειλαν οἱ Ἰουδαῖοι ἐξ Ἱεροσολύμων ἱερεῖς καὶ Λευΐτας ἵνα ἐρωτήσωσιν αὐτόν, Σὺ τίς εἶ;
After ἀπέστειλαν, some ancient Greek versions add πρὸς αὐτόν.

In the King James Version of the Bible the text reads:
And this is the record of John, when the Jews sent priests and Levites from Jerusalem to ask him, Who art thou?

The New International Version translates the passage as:
Now this was John's testimony when the Jews of Jerusalem sent priests and Levites to ask him who he was.

Analysis
Heinrich Meyer notes that John's "historical narrative" begins with this verse.

"And this is the witness of John ...", the same as the testimony of John seen in verse 15. It seems that John the Baptist often bore witness to Jesus, that He was the Messiah, both before and after his baptism.

"The Jews sent ...": According to Catholic writer Robert Witham, these men were priests and Levites who appear to have been sent by the Sanhedrin to enquire of John the Baptist, who was then held in great esteem, to see if he was their Messiah, for it was believed he was to come about that time. Lapide comments that "the reason for this embassy was because the chief priests saw John leading in the desert an angelic life, preaching with great power, baptizing, and moving men to repentance, as none of the other prophets had done". The mention of both priests and levites together is "a trait illustrative of John’s precision of statement".

Commentary from the Church Fathers
Origen: "This is the second testimony of John the Baptist to Christ, the first began with, This is He of Whom I spake; and ended with, He hath declared Him."

Theophylact of Ohrid: "Or, after the introduction above of John's testimony to Christ, is preferred before me, the Evangelist now adds when the above testimony was given, And this is the record of John, when the Jews sent priests and Levites from Jerusalem."

Origen: "The Jews of Jerusalem, as being of kin to the Baptist, who was of the priestly stock, send Priests and Levites to ask him who he is; that is, men considered to hold a superior rank to the rest of their order, by God's election, and coming from that favoured above all cities, Jerusalem. Such is the reverential way in which they interrogate John. We read of no such proceeding towards Christ: but what the Jews did to John, John in turn does to Christ, when he asks Him, through His disciples, Art thou He that should come, (Luke 7:20) or look we for another?"

Chrysostom: "Such confidence had they in John, that they were ready to believe him on his own words: witness how it is said, To ask him, Who art thou?"

Augustine: "They would not have sent, unless they had been impressed by his lofty exercise of authority, in daring to baptize."

References

External links
Other translations of John 1:19 at BibleHub

01:19